Chogye may refer to

Jogye Order, a Korean Buddhist order
Hapcheon, a county in South Gyeongsang province, South Korea